Łojszyno  (German Leussin) is a village in the administrative district of Gmina Wolin, within Kamień County, West Pomeranian Voivodeship, in north-western Poland. 

References

Villages in Kamień County